The men's C-2 1000 metres event was an open-style, pairs canoeing event conducted as part of the Canoeing at the 1976 Summer Olympics program.

Medalists

Results

Heats
The 15 teams first raced in two heats on July 29. The top three finishers from each of the heats advanced directly to the semifinal and the remaining ten teams were relegated to the repechages.

Repechages
Taking place on July 29, the top three finishers from each of the repechages advanced to the semifinals.

Semifinals
Three semifinals were held on July 31. The top three finishers from each of the semifinals advanced to the final.

Final
The final was held on July 31.

References
1976 Summer Olympics official report Volume 3. p. 185. 
Sports-reference.com 1976 C-2 1000 m results.

Men's C-2 1000
Men's events at the 1976 Summer Olympics